Moosomin 112B is an Indian reserve of the Moosomin First Nation in Saskatchewan. It is 32 kilometres north of North Battleford. In the 2016 Canadian Census, it recorded a population of 724 living in 183 of its 195 total private dwellings. In the same year, its Community Well-Being index was calculated at 48 of 100, compared to 58.4 for the average First Nations community and 77.5 for the average non-Indigenous community.

References

Indian reserves in Saskatchewan
Division No. 17, Saskatchewan